Le Télégramme is a French-language daily newspaper from the Brittany region of France, based in the commune of Morlaix. It was founded in 1944 and still exists to this day, although circulation has been declining since 2012.

History and profile
Le Télégramme was founded on 12 September 1944 by members of the French Resistance as the Germans retreated following D-Day and the 6 June 1944 Normandy landings. The newspaper is distributed in the Finistère department, the Côtes-d'Armor department and elsewhere in Brittany.

References

External links
 Le Télégramme, quotidien régional de Bretagne

Daily newspapers published in France
French news websites